Fürstenwalde/Spree (Lower Sorbian: Pśibor pśi Sprjewje) is the most populous town in the Oder-Spree District of Brandenburg, Germany.

Geography
In the north, the municipal area comprises the village of Trebus. The town is located on the western part of historic Lubusz Land (Land Lebus).

The Fürstenwalde station is a stop on the railway line from Berlin to Frankfurt (Oder), the former Lower Silesian-Marcher Railway. It also has access to the parallel Bundesautobahn 12. The 39 MW Fürstenwalde Solar Park supplies electricity to the local grid.

History
The settlement of Fürstenwalde in the Margraviate of Brandenburg was first mentioned in a 1272 deed, founded in the course of the German Ostsiedlung migration at a ford across the Spree river, probably near the site of a former Slavic settlement. The Lebus Land had been acquired from Poland by the Ascanian margraves in 1248/1249. The town's importance rose as a staple port and terminal of the transportation of goods on the river.

In 1373 Emperor Charles IV, since 1367 also Margrave of adjacent Lower Lusatia campaigned the Brandenburg lands and enforced the renunciation of the Wittelsbach margrave Otto VII of Brandenburg by the Treaty of Fürstenwalde. As also the collegiate church in Lebus was destroyed, Bishop Wenceslaus moved the official seat of the Bishopric of Lebus to Fürstenwalde, where the St Mary's Church was raised to a cathedral.

The last Catholic bishop was Georg von Blumenthal (1490–1550), who was besieged in his palace by Lutheran robbers led by Nickel von Minckwitz. The Bishop had to escape through a window in disguise. The bishopric was secularized during the Reformation in 1555, and was completely disbanded at the ascension of Joachim Frederick as Margrave of Brandenburg in 1598.

Demography

Politics
Seats in the town's assembly (Stadtverordnetenversammlung) as of 2014 local elections:
The Left: 7
Christian Democratic Union of Germany (CDU): 6
Social Democratic Party of Germany (SPD): 6
Free Voters (BFZ): 5
Free Democratic Party (FDP): 3
Alternative for Germany (AfD): 2
Alliance 90/The Greens: 2
Pirate Party Germany: 1

Twin towns – sister cities

Fürstenwalde is twinned with:
 Choszczno, Poland
 Reinheim, Germany
 Sulechów, Poland

Notable people

Karl Friedrich Schulz (1784–1850), Protestant composer and music teacher
Julius Pintsch (1815–1884), founder of the former industrial company Julius Pintsch AG Berlin-Fürstenwalde
Ernst Laas (1837–1885), pedagogue and philosopher
Max Valentin (1875–1920), sculptor and architect
Wilhelm Burgdorf (1895–1945), general of the infantry
Wolfgang Götze (born 1937), theoretical physicist
Hans-Michael Rehberg (1938–2017), actor and film director
Ludolf von Wartenberg (born 1941), politician, member of Bundestag
Helmut Panke (born 1946), manager
Burkhard Reich (born 1964), footballer
Axel Schulz (born 1968), boxer

References

External links

Official website 
History of Fürstenwalde 

Localities in Oder-Spree